Johnny Simmons (born November 28, 1986) is an American actor. He is known for his roles as Dylan Baxter in Evan Almighty (2007), Chip Dove in Jennifer's Body (2009), "Young Neil" Nordegraf in Scott Pilgrim vs. the World (2010), Brad Hayes in The Perks of Being a Wallflower (2012), serial killer Adam "Balloon Man" Kemper in Elementary (2012), Peter Newmans in The Late Bloomer (2016), and Shane in Girlboss (2017).

Early life
Simmons was born on November 28, 1986, in Montgomery, Alabama, and raised in Dallas, Texas. He attended Nathan Adams Elementary School and T. C. Marsh Middle School for his early education. In 2005, he graduated from W. T. White High School.

Career
Simmons landed his first feature film role in the 2007 comedy Evan Almighty. He portrayed Dylan Baxter, the oldest of the three sons of Steve Carell's Evan Baxter and Lauren Graham's Joan Baxter. He then starred in a number of films, including the 2009 children's comedy Hotel for Dogs, opposite Jake T. Austin and Emma Roberts. Also in 2009, Simmons starred in the black comedy horror film Jennifer's Body as Chip Dove, the boyfriend of Amanda Seyfried's character, Anita "Needy" Lesnicki. In 2010, he starred in the comedy film Scott Pilgrim vs. the World, portraying Young Neil, a 20-year-old bass guitarist and fan of the fictional band Sex Bob-omb. In 2011, he was cast in a supporting role for the Jonah Hill and Channing Tatum led comedy 21 Jump Street (2012). The film opened at South by Southwest on March 12, and was released theatrically on March 16, 2012.

Also in 2012, Simmons co-starred as the closeted quarterback Brad Hayes, alongside Logan Lerman, Emma Watson, and Ezra Miller, in the teen drama The Perks of Being a Wallflower. The film is an adaptation of the Stephen Chbosky novel of the same name. In February 2013, he was cast in The CW's television drama film Blink. In 2013, he made a cameo appearance in the music video for Drake's single "Hold On, We're Going Home". That same year, Simmons joined the comedy film Frank and Cindy as GJ Erchternkamp, alongside Rene Russo and Oliver Platt. Also that same year, he starred in the short film Whiplash, excerpted from a screenplay by Damien Chazelle, the complete version of which became an Academy Award-winning feature-length film of the same name.  In 2014, he starred as Jack London in the Discovery Channel miniseries Klondike, the channel's first scripted series, which detailed the Klondike Gold Rush in the 1890s. In 2015, he co-starred as Jeff Jansen in the thriller film The Stanford Prison Experiment, and in 2016, had the lead role in four films, the border-set thriller Transpecos, the comedy-musical Dreamland, the baseball drama The Phenom, and Kevin Pollak's comedy The Late Bloomer.

Filmography

Film

Television

References

External links

 

1986 births
21st-century American male actors
American male film actors
American male television actors
Living people
Male actors from Dallas
Male actors from Montgomery, Alabama
W. T. White High School alumni